Callos is a stew common across Spain, and is considered traditional to Madrid. In Madrid, it is referred to as ''callos a la madrileña.

It contains beef tripe and chickpeas, blood sausage and peppers. Chorizo sausage may also be used. Another simple recipe of callos is boiling the tripe until tender, slicing it into strips and cooking it in pork and beans with peppers. It is common to add cheese to it to enhance the flavour.

See also

 Cocido
 List of legume dishes
 List of stews

References

Spanish soups and stews
Offal dishes
Chickpea dishes
Spanish legume dishes